Kapisoda is a surname. Notable people with the surname include:

Aleksandar Kapisoda (born 1989), Montenegrin footballer
Filip Kapisoda (1987–2010), Montenegrin model and handball player
Petar Kapisoda (born 1976), Montenegrin handball player

Montenegrin surnames